Phylloflavan is a phenolic compound found in the New Zealand Podocarpaceae Phyllocladus alpinus.

References 

Flavanols